The thicket antpitta (Hylopezus dives) is a species of bird in the family Grallariidae. It is found in Colombia, Costa Rica, Honduras, Nicaragua, Panama, and perhaps Ecuador. Its natural habitats are subtropical or tropical moist lowland forest and heavily degraded former forest.

References

thicket antpitta
Birds of Costa Rica
Birds of Nicaragua
Birds of Colombia
thicket antpitta
thicket antpitta
Taxonomy articles created by Polbot